Richard T. Sale (born 1939) is a journalist and novelist, best known for his report The Blackstone Rangers (1971). He is currently the Intelligence Correspondent for the Middle East Times.

Career
Sale has worked for The Washington Post and The San Francisco Examiner. He has most recently worked for UPI as a special correspondent for five years.

Awards and honors
Sale has won a number of awards and was a Pulitzer Prize finalist.

Publications
The Blackstone Rangers is a book-length investigative report on the Black P. Stone Rangers.  Sale is also the author of Traitors: The Worst Acts of Treason in American History from Benedict Arnold to Robert Hanssen (2003) and  Clinton’s Secret Wars.

Personal
Richard Sale lived in Durham, North Carolina.

References

Living people
1939 births
20th-century American journalists
American male journalists